is a Japanese slice of life comedy shōnen web manga series written and illustrated by Nozomi Uda. It was published by Square Enix, being serialized on the Gangan Online website from July 2013 to July 2019. Thirteen volumes have been released . An anime adaptation by Silver Link aired from April 9 to June 25, 2016.

Characters

A listless student who is always dozing and acts exhausted when awake. He can sleep in almost any location, but prefers to be outside when he does so. His uncaring, sleepy nature forces Ohta to carry him to and from multiple locations quite often. Despite his general lack of enthusiasm, he shows on multiple occasions that he doesn't see friendship as bothersome, most specifically when Shiraishi pleaded with him to let her be his friend, he simply responded "I thought we already were." However, he does find the prospect of Miyano being his "apprentice" to be more trouble than it's worth. Despite being lazy, he is shown to score high in tests and is relatively strong as he threw a badminton racquet.

A tall and stoic student, who is very reliable and is often looking after Tanaka. Tanaka states that because of Ohta's caring nature, he sees Ohta as the perfect candidate for marriage. He states on multiple occasions that he admires Tanaka's ability to be listless in any given situation, but also feels that Tanaka's personality causes him to miss out on things like romance and love.

Tanaka's classmate with short stature. She admires Tanaka for his listlessness. She knows about Shiraishi's crush on Tanaka, and vows to support her in her quest for love. She constantly proclaims herself to be Tanaka's apprentice in listlessness, however he constantly decries her.

Ohta's short-tempered childhood friend who dresses and acts like a delinquent. She is Miyano's best friend and affectionately calls her "." Despite her tomboyish manner, Echizen adores cute things, to the point where she refuses to eat sweets shaped like cute animals.

A beautiful and intelligent student, she is very popular among both males and females. After Tanaka recognizes her when she isn't putting effort into her appearance (a short running theme in the show is that she looks completely different when she dresses herself more comfortably), she develops a crush on Tanaka, believing that he is able to see her for who she is regardless of how she looks. (In reality, he was able to discern her in both forms of dress due to her bust size.)

Tanaka's sister. She is a middle school student who is the manager of the Volleyball Club of her school. She expresses a dislike towards Ohta, brought about by Ohta and Tanaka's close relationship, and sometimes gets jealous. She has a crush on her older brother, Tanaka.

Ohta's sister, who goes to same school as Rino. She is a shy person with an unusually small voice. She belongs to the Volleyball Club. In comparison to her brother's taller and heavier build, she states that Tanaka seems "prince-like" due to his pale, more slender features.

Tanaka's classmate. He is cool and intelligent, but has a weakness for girls. He looks so different when not wearing eyeglasses that he cannot be recognized.

Tanaka's classmate. He is good at sports and loves soccer.

Media

Manga

Anime
An anime television series adaptation by Silver Link aired from April 9 to June 25, 2016, on Tokyo MX and MBS. The anime was directed by Shinya Kawatsura and written by Akemi Omode. The character designs were handled by Haruko Iizuka and the music was composed by Hiromi Mizutani. The first and second home video release volumes bundled an OVA each, which were released on June 24 and July 22, 2016, respectively.

Episode list

Reception

Manga
The manga has sold 1 million copies in Japan as of November 2015. Volume 2 reached the 32nd place on the weekly Oricon manga charts and, as of July 27, 2014, had sold 37,291 copies; volume 3 reached the 16th place and, as of November 30, 2014, had sold 63,079 copies.
It was tied at 17th place on the 2015 Kono Manga ga Sugoi! Top 20 Manga for Female Readers survey. It was also placed 4th on Zenkoku Shotenin ga Eranda Osusume Comic 2015.

References

External links
  
  
 

2010s webcomics
2013 manga
Anime series based on manga
Comedy anime and manga
Gangan Online manga
Japanese webcomics
Sentai Filmworks
Shōnen manga
Silver Link
Television shows based on Japanese webcomics
Webcomics in print